Dairylea is a popular brand of processed cheese products produced by Mondelēz International and available in Ireland and the United Kingdom. As of 2017, it is also available in Australia.

Background
Dairylea is usually in the form of a thick, spreadable soft cheese-flavoured paste. It became famous for the slogans "Kids will eat it until the cows come home" and "Kids will do anything for the taste of Dairylea" and a series of adverts on UK television showing children trading toys and other items of value, or doing dares for Dairylea Triangles.

Manufacture
For many years, Dairylea has been made at Mondelez International's Namur production site south of Rhisnes (suburb), La Bruyère, north of Namur, the centre of Wallonia (the south of Belgium). The plant also makes Philadelphia cream cheese, and is near the A15 motorway, accessed via the N4. The company also had a processed cheese factory in Anderlecht in Brussels.

Products

Dairylea spread is packaged in a plastic tub. Dairylea triangles are packaged in a cardboard 'wheel' and opening it reveals the foil-wrapped soft cheese product portions. Dairylea is also available in these formats:
 Dairylea Slices; single slices of processed cheese (much like Kraft Singles) 
 Dairylea Strip Cheese; strips of processed cheese packaged in a single serving block, visually similar to string cheese
 Dairylea Dunkers; snacks consisting of cheese spread dip and breadsticks, tortilla chips, Ritz Crackers or jumbo tubes (much like The Laughing Cow Cheez Dippers)
 Dairylea Lunchables Stackers; lunchbox staple of crackers, processed cheese and ham or chicken slices. Briefly discontinued under the Dairylea brand, it has since returned.
 Dairylea Snackers; as with Lunchables but without meat, and containing mini Oreos or mini chocolate chip cookies
 Dairylea Filled Crackers;

Discontinued formats of Dairylea include:
 Dairylea Rippers
 Dairylea Double Dunkers; as with Dairylea Dunkers but with two dips,  either pizza sauce or salsa, and the dunkers were pizza-flavoured crackers and tortilla chips respectively
 Dairylea Dunkers Fromage Frais; strawberry flavoured fromage frais with biscuits
 Dairylea Tri-Bites; wax-sealed processed cheese triangles, similar to Babybel
 Dairylea Lunchables Pizza (reintroduced in 2016 as "Dairylea Lunchables Stackers Pepperoni Pizza" with a different recipe)
 Dairylea Lunchables Double Cheese stackers
 Dairylea Lunchables Hotdogs, Chicken Burgers, Pitta Pouches, Subs and Wraps
 Dairylea Lunchables Fun Packs; a complete lunch consisting of one variant of Lunchables, a Capri-Sun pouch (later replaced with orange juice) and a treat item of mini Daim bars, mini Milka bars or a mini roll (later replaced with a strawberry yogurt pouch)
Dairylea also comes in both its original form and a 'Dairylea Light' product marketed as 7% fat. Kraft implies that the product is credited with getting children more interested in cheese. It is also branded as Susanna in Italy.

History
Dairylea triangles were first introduced in 1950.

In the early 21st century, Dairylea Lunchables were advertised as being "full of good stuff", though the product contained high amounts of salt and saturated fats. Despite a 2007 reformulation that reduced salt content by 9% and saturated fat content by 34%, the claim "full of good stuff" was banned by the UK's Advertising Standards Authority. Kraft meanwhile stated that the salt content in Lunchables had been reduced by a third between 2005 and 2007.

Sponsorship
In the late 1990s, Dairylea Dunkers sponsored the 1999–2000 British Basketball League season, in the British Basketball League.

See also
 List of spreads

References

External links 
 

Kraft Foods brands
Mondelez International brands
Namur (province)
Processed cheese